Nunweiller is the surname of the following people
Ion Nunweiller (1936–2015), Romanian Romanian football defender and manager
Lică Nunweiller (1938–2013), Romanian football midfielder, brother of Ion and Radu
Radu Nunweiller (born 1944), Romanian football player, brother of Ion and Lică